The Pflanzengarten Bad Schandau (6100 m²) is a botanical garden located in the Saxon Switzerland National Park on the Kirnitzschtalstraße, Bad Schandau, Saxony, Germany. It is open daily in the warmer months.

The garden opened in 1902 as the Regionalbotanischer Garten Sachsens (Saxon Regional Botanical Garden), with a goal of preserving local plants, including rare poisonous and medicinal plants. As of 2002, it contained nearly 1000 taxa from cool and moist climates around the world, but focuses on plants of the Saxon Switzerland area, including 323 species from the area, of which about 80 species were protected or on Saxony's Red List.

See also 
 List of botanical gardens in Germany

External links 
 Pflanzengarten Bad Schandau
 Wandern in der Sächsischen Schweiz
 BGCI entry

Botanical gardens in Germany
Gardens in Saxony